Nili Block (born January 16, 1995) is a professional Muay thai and Kickboxing fighter. She is a 4-time Muay Thai and 2-time Kickboxing world champion representing Israel.

Early life
Born in Baltimore, Maryland, in the United States, Nili is one of six siblings  to a dentist father and homemaker mother. Nili describes herself as a "traditional" or "observant" Jew 
 who keeps kosher and the Jewish Sabbath. Bringing kosher food with her when she travels to competitions. observing the Jewish shabbat  from Friday sundown to Saturday sundown, as well as other traditional restrictions on time and practice pose a special challenge which makes her achievements all the more remarkable.

At the age of two, Nili and her family made aliyah to Israel from Maryland. They settled and now live in the religious neighborhood of Ramat Beit Shemesh in Beit Shemesh, Israel.

Her mother, Rina, became a volunteer officer in the Israeli Defense Forces Border Police, and makes a living as a biking instructor and by cleaning homes.

At age 11, Nili began representing Israel in international competitions as a member of the Israeli Women's American Flag Football National Team. She gave up the sport in 2012 in order to focus more fully on a single sport: Muay Thai.

In 2015, in 12th grade, as a student at an ulpana, a high school for Orthodox girls, Nili beat hundreds of other girls in the 10K run of the 2013 Jerusalem Marathon.

As her sports are not supported by Olympic-style budgets, Nili cleans homes and delivers newspapers to pay for her travel and training,

Kickboxing and Muay Thai career
When she was 10 years old, Nili's mother suggested she learn kickboxing, as a manner of self-defense. She trained at a kickboxing academy at Teddy Stadium in Jerusalem.

Her coach her entire career has been Benny Cogan, who is also Israel's national kickboxing and Muay Thai coach, and she is trained as well by Eddie Yusupov.

Nili is designated as an "outstanding athlete" by the Israel Defense Forces, which allows her to be in a special program that permits her to compete in international kickboxing competitions.

In 2012 she became world champion in the flyweight class (50.5-53.5 kilos) at the 10th Amateur/Pro-Am Muay Thai Championships in Bangkok, Thailand.

In May 2015, when she was in 12th grade, Block won a gold medal in her age category in the XIX KickBox World Cup in the 52- to 56-kilo category in Hungary.

In October 2015, Block won a gold medal at the Kickboxing World Championships in Belgrade, Serbia, in the 60 kg (132 pound) senior division. She said: "It is such a good feeling [being a champion].... it’s so special to become a symbol in the world as a Jew and as an Israeli. They didn’t expect me to win, coming from such a small country. Who would have expected it?" That year she was named Female Athlete of the Year by the Federation of Non-Olympic Competitive Sports in Israel (Ayelet).

In 2016, at 20 years of age, she won the 17th International Federation of Muaythai Amateur (IFMA) World Championship for the first time, in the 60 kg division, in Jonkoping, Sweden.

In 2017, Nili won the gold medal at the Muay Thai World Championship in the 60 kg division.

She is also the two-time defending European champion. In October 2017, she won the gold medal at the Thai Boxing European Championships in the women's 60 kg division in Paris, France.

That year, in July she also won a bronze medal in Muay Thai at the 2017 World Games in Wroclaw, Poland, taking third in the women's 60 kg Muay Thai event.

Championships and accomplishments

Professional
International Sport Karate Association
 2019 ISKA K-1 World -60kg Champion

Amateur
World Association of Kickboxing Organizations
 2014 WAKO Kickboxing European Championships K-1 (-60 kg) - Bronze Medal
 2015 WAKO Kickboxing World Championships K-1 (-60 kg) - Gold Medal

International Federation of Muaythai Amateur
 2014 IFMA European Championships (-60 kg) - Gold Medal
 2016 IFMA World Championships (-60 kg) - Gold Medal  
 2017 IFMA World Championship (-60 kg) - Gold Medal
 2017 IFMA European Championships (-60 kg) - Gold Medal
 2018 IFMA World Championship (-60 kg) - Gold Medal
 2018 FISU Muaythai World Championships (-60 kg) - Gold Medal
 2018 IFMA European Championships (-60 kg) - Gold Medal
 2018 EMF Antalya Open (-60 kg) - Gold Medal
 2019 IFMA World Championship (-60 kg) - Gold Medal
 2019 IFMA European Championships (-60 kg) - Gold Medal

World Games
 2017 World Games Muay Thai (-60 kg) - Bronze Medal
 2022 World Games Muay Thai (-60 kg) - Silver Medal

Fight record

|- style="background:#cfc;"
| 2019-12-12 || Win ||align=left| Stephanie Ielo Page || Championnat Du Monde Kickboxing || Paris, France || Decision || 5 || 3:00  
|-
! style=background:white colspan=9 |
|-

|- style="background:#fbb;"
| 2019-03-09 || Loss ||align=left| Maurine Atef || TEK Fight II || Meaux, France || Decision || 3 || 3:00 

|- style="background:#fbb;"
| 2018-09-09 || Loss ||align=left| Cong Wang || Kunlun Fight 76 - Legend of Mulan Tournament Semifinal || Zhangqiu, China || Decision || 3 || 3:00 
|-
|- style="background:#cfc;"
| 2018-09-09 || Win ||align=left| Mingrui Li || Kunlun Fight 76 - Legend of Mulan Tournament Quarterfinal || Zhangqiu, China || KO (High kick) || 1 ||   
|-
|- style="background:#fbb;"
| 2014-03-21 || Loss ||align=left| Stephanie Ielo Page || WMF World Championship, Final || Pattaya, Thailand || Decision || 3 || 3:00  
|-
! style=background:white colspan=9 |

|- style="background:#cfc;"
| 2014-03-21 || Win||align=left| Maria Lobo || WMF World Championship, Semi Final || Pattaya, Thailand || Decision || 3 || 3:00 
|-
| colspan=9 | Legend:    

|-  style="background:#fbb;"
| 2022-07-17|| Loss ||align=left| Charlsey Maner || 2022 World Games, Tournament Finals || Birmingham, Alabama, United States || Decision (Unanimous) || 3 ||3:00
|-
! style=background:white colspan=9 |
|-
|-  style="background:#cfc;"
| 2022-07-16|| Win ||align=left| Niamh Kinehan || 2022 World Games, Tournament Semifinals || Birmingham, Alabama, United States || Decision (Unanimous) || 3 ||3:00
|-
|-  style="background:#cfc;"
| 2022-07-15|| Win ||align=left| Ewin Ates || 2022 World Games, Tournament Quarterfinals || Birmingham, Alabama, United States || Decision (Unanimous) || 3 ||3:00
|-
|-  style="background:#cfc;"
| 2019-11-09 || Win||align=left| Darya Bialkova || 2019 IFMA European Muaythai Championships, Tournament Finals || Minsk, Belarus || Decision (Unanimous) || 3 ||3:00
|-
! style=background:white colspan=9 |
|-
|-  style="background:#cfc;"
| 2019-11-07 || Win||align=left| Ekaterina Vinnikova || 2019 IFMA European Muaythai Championships, Tournament Semifinals|| Minsk, Belarus || Decision (Unanimous) || 3 ||3:00
|-
|-  style="background:#cfc;"
| 2019-09-01 || Win||align=left| Taylor McClatchie || 2019 Chungju World Martial Arts Masterships, Tournament Finals || Chungju, China || Decision (Unanimous) || 3 ||3:00
|-
! style=background:white colspan=9 |
|-
|-  style="background:#cfc;"
| 2019-08-31 || Win||align=left| Kaewrudee Kamtakrapoom || 2019 Chungju World Martial Arts Masterships, Tournament Semifinals || Chungju, China || Decision (Unanimous) || 3 ||3:00
|-
|-  style="background:#cfc;"
| 2019-08-30 || Win||align=left| Jamiyandorj Odgerel || 2019 Chungju World Martial Arts Masterships, Tournament Quarterfinals || Chungju, China || Decision (Unanimous) || 3 ||3:00
|-
|-  style="background:#cfc;"
| 2019-07-28 || Win||align=left| Ekaterina Vinnikova || 2019 IFMA World Championships, Tournament Finals || Bangkok, Thailand || Decision (Unanimous) || 3 ||3:00
|-
! style=background:white colspan=9 |
|-
|-  style="background:#cfc;"
| 2019-07-27 || Win||align=left| Darya Bialkova || 2019 IFMA World Championships, Tournament Semifinals || Bangkok, Thailand || Decision (Unanimous) || 3 ||3:00
|-
|-  style="background:#cfc;"
| 2019-07-25 || Win||align=left| Lucia Szabova || 2019 IFMA World Championships, Tournament Quarterfinals || Bangkok, Thailand || Decision (Unanimous) || 3 ||3:00
|-
|-  style="background:#cfc;"
| 2019-07-22 || Win||align=left| Britney Dolheguy || 2019 IFMA World Championships, Tournament Opening Round || Bangkok, Thailand || Decision (Unanimous) || 2 ||3:00
|-

|-  style="background:#cfc;"
| 2018-11-18|| Win||align=left| Sultan Unal|| 2018 EMF Antalya Muaythai Open, Tournament Finals || Antalya, Turkey || Decision (Unanimous)  || 3 || 3:00
|-
! style=background:white colspan=9 |

|-  style="background:#cfc;"
| 2018-11-17|| Win||align=left|  || 2018 EMF Antalya Muaythai Open, Tournament Semifinals || Antalya, Turkey || Decision   || 3 || 3:00

|-  style="background:#cfc;"
| 2018-11-16|| Win||align=left| Ewin Ates Sweden || 2018 EMF Antalya Muaythai Open, Tournament Quarterfinals || Antalya, Turkey || Decision (Unanimous)  || 3 || 3:00

|-  style="background:#cfc;"
| 2018-11-15|| Win||align=left| İlknur Kurt|| 2018 EMF Antalya Muaythai Open, Tournament First Round || Antalya, Turkey || Decision (Unanimous)  || 3 || 3:00

|-  style="background:#cfc;"
| 2018-07-29|| Win||align=left| Alejandra Romero Calvo || 2018 FISU World Muaythai Championships, Tournament Finals || Pattaya, Thailand || TKO  || 2 ||
|-
! style=background:white colspan=9 |

|-  style="background:#cfc;"
| 2018-07-29|| Win||align=left| Tabtrai Keisnee || 2018 FISU World Muaythai Championships, Tournament Seminals || Pattaya, Thailand || TKO  || 3 ||

|-  style="background:#cfc;"
| 2018-07-07|| Win||align=left| Karolina Klusova || 2018 IFMA European Muaythai Championships, Tournament Finals || Prague, Czech Republic || Decision (Unanimous) || 3 ||3:00
|-
! style=background:white colspan=9 |
|-
|-  style="background:#cfc;"
| 2018-07-04 || Win||align=left| Gia Winberg || 2018 IFMA European Muaythai Championships, Tournament Semifinals || Prague, Czech Republic || Decision (Unanimous) || 3 ||3:00
|-
|-  style="background:#cfc;"
| 2018-07-02 || Win||align=left| Darya Bialkova || 2018 IFMA European Muaythai Championships, Tournament Quarterfinals || Prague, Czech Republic || Decision (Unanimous) || 3 ||3:00
|-
|-  style="background:#cfc;"
| 2018-05-19 || Win||align=left| Ekaterina Vinnikova || 2018 IFMA World Muaythai Championships, Tournament Finals || Cancun, Mexico || Decision (Unanimous) || 3 ||3:00
|-
! style=background:white colspan=9 |
|-
|-  style="background:#cfc;"
| 2018-05-18 || Win||align=left| Mariya Valent || 2018 IFMA World Muaythai Championships, Tournament Semifinals || Cancun, Mexico || Decision (Unanimous) || 3 ||3:00
|-
|-  style="background:#cfc;"
| 2018-05-15 || Win||align=left| Nagihan Kalyoncu || 2018 IFMA World Muaythai Championships, Tournament Quarterfinals || Cancun, Mexico || Decision (Unanimous) || 3 ||3:00
|-
|-  style="background:#cfc;"
| 2018-05-15 || Win||align=left| Isa Tidblad Keskikangas || 2018 IFMA World Muaythai Championships, Tournament Opening Round || Cancun, Mexico || Decision (Unanimous) || 3 ||3:00
|-
|-  style="background:#cfc;"
| 2017-10-22 || Win||align=left| Ekaterina Vinnikova || 2017 IFMA European Muaythai Championships, Tournament Finals || Paris, France || Decision (Unanimous) || 3 ||3:00
|-
! style=background:white colspan=9 |
|-
|-  style="background:#cfc;"
| 2017-10-21 || Win||align=left| Hanna Shytava || 2017 IFMA European Muaythai Championships, Tournament Semifinals || Paris, France || Decision (Unanimous) || 3 ||3:00
|-
|-  style="background:#cfc;"
| 2017-10-20 || Win||align=left| Isa Tidblad Keskikangas || 2017 IFMA European Muaythai Championships, Tournament Quarterfinals || Paris, France || Decision (Unanimous) || 3 ||3:00
|-

|-  style="background:#cfc;"
| 2017-07-30|| Win||align=left| Antje Van Der Molen || 2017 World Games, Bronze Medal Fight || Wroclaw, Poland || Decision (Unanimous) || 3 ||3:00
|-
! style=background:white colspan=9 |

|-  style="background:#fbb;"
| 2017-07-29|| Loss||align=left| Svetlana Vinnikova|| 2017 World Games, Tournament Semifinal || Wroclaw, Poland || Decision  || 3 ||3:00

|-  style="background:#cfc;"
| 2017-07-28|| Win||align=left| Marta Gusztab|| 2017 World Games, Tournament Quarterfinal|| Wroclaw, Poland || TKO||  ||

|-  style="background:#cfc;"
| 2017-05-11|| Win ||align=left| Anastasia Nepianidi || 2017 IFMA World Muaythai Championships, Tournament Final|| Minsk, Belarus || Decision || 3 ||3:00
|-
! style=background:white colspan=9 |

|-  style="background:#cfc;"
| 2017-05-08|| Win ||align=left| Gia Winberg || 2017 IFMA World Muaythai Championships, Tournament Semifinals|| Minsk, Belarus || Decision || 3 ||3:00

|-  style="background:#cfc;"
| 2017-05-07|| Win ||align=left| Valeria Slizchenko || 2017 IFMA World Muaythai Championships, Tournament Quarterfinals|| Minsk, Belarus || Decision || 3 ||3:00

|-  style="background:#cfc;"
| 2017-05-05|| Win ||align=left| Nathalie Visschers || 2017 IFMA World Muaythai Championships, Tournament First Round|| Minsk, Belarus || TKO || 1 ||

|-  style="background:#cfc;"
| 2016-11-26|| Win||align=left| Anaëlle Angerville || IFMA World Cup 2016 in Kazan, Tournament Final || Kazan, Russia || Decision || 3 ||3:00
|-
! style=background:white colspan=9 |

|-  style="background:#cfc;"
| 2016-11-25|| Win||align=left| Ekaterina Vinnikova || IFMA World Cup 2016 in Kazan, Tournament Semifinals || Kazan, Russia || Decision || 3 ||3:00

|-  style="background:#cfc;"
| 2016-05-28|| Win ||align=left| Lryna Chernave || 2016 IFMA World Muaythai Championships, Tournament Final|| Jonkoping, Sweden || Decision (Unanimous)|| 3 ||3:00
|-
! style=background:white colspan=9 |

|-  style="background:#cfc;"
| 2016-05-26|| Win ||align=left| Ekaterina Vinnikuva|| 2016 IFMA World Muaythai Championships, Tournament Semifinals|| Jonkoping, Sweden || Decision (Unanimous)|| 3 ||3:00 

|-  style="background:#cfc;"
| 2016-05-24|| Win ||align=left| Nina Scheucher || 2016 IFMA World Muaythai Championships, Tournament Quarterfinals|| Jonkoping, Sweden || Decision (Unanimous)|| 3 ||3:00 

|-  style="background:#cfc;"
| 2016-05-19|| Win ||align=left| Jacqueline De Beer || 2016 IFMA World Muaythai Championships, Tournament First Round|| Jonkoping, Sweden || Decision (Unanimous)|| 3 ||3:00 

|-  style="background:#cfc;"
| 2015-10-31|| Win||align=left| Marija Malencia || 2015 WAKO World Championships, Tournament Final || Dublin, Ireland || Decision (Split) || 3 ||2:00
|-
! style=background:white colspan=9 |

|-  style="background:#cfc;"
| 2015-10-30|| Win||align=left| Alena Muratava || 2015 WAKO World Championships, Tournament Semifinal || Dublin, Ireland || Decision (Unanimous) || 3 ||2:00

|-  style="background:#cfc;"
| 2015-10-29|| Win||align=left| Senay Cakir || 2015 WAKO World Championships, Tournament Quarterfinal || Dublin, Ireland || Decision (Unanimous) || 3 ||2:00

|-  style="background:#cfc;"
| 2015-10-28|| Win||align=left| Sara Surrel || 2015 WAKO World Championships, Tournament First Round|| Dublin, Ireland || Decision (Unanimous) || 3 ||2:00

|-  style="background:#fbb;"
| 2015-08-16|| Loss||align=left| Valentina Shevchenko || 2015 I.F.M.A. Royal World cup , Tournament quarterfinals  || Bangkok, Thailand || Decision || 3 || 3:00

|-  style="background:#cfc;"
| 2015-08-15|| Win ||align=left| Jacqueline De Beer || 2015 I.F.M.A. Royal World cup , Tournament First Round|| Bangkok, Thailand || TKO|| 3 || 

|-  style="background:#fbb;"
| 2014-10-24|| Loss ||align=left| Alena Muratava || 2014 WAKO European Championships, Tournament Semifinals || Bilbao, Spain || Decision (Unanimous) || 3 ||2:00
|-
! style=background:white colspan=9 |

|-  style="background:#cfc;"
| 2014-10-22|| Win||align=left| Giulia Grenci || 2014 WAKO European Championships, Tournament Quarterfinals || Bilbao, Spain || Decision (Unanimous) || 3 ||2:00

|-  style="background:#cfc;"
| 2014-10-21|| Win||align=left| Kubra Karabag || 2014 WAKO European Championships, Tournament First Round || Bilbao, Spain || Decision (Unanimous) || 3 ||2:00

|-  style="background:#cfc;"
| 2014-09-24 || Win||align=left| Mariya Valent || 2014 IFMA European Muaythai Championships, Tournament Finals || Kraków, Poland || Decision (Unanimous) || 3 ||3:00
|-
! style=background:white colspan=9 |
|-
|-  style="background:#cfc;"
| 2014-09-23 || Win||align=left| Nathalie Visschers || 2014 IFMA European Muaythai Championships, Tournament Semifinals || Kraków, Poland || Decision (Unanimous) || 3 ||3:00

|-
| colspan=9 | Legend:

See also
 List of select Jewish mixed martial artists

References

External links
 
 
 

Living people
American emigrants to Israel
American Modern Orthodox Jews
Israeli Modern Orthodox Jews
Israeli female kickboxers
Israeli Muay Thai practitioners
Sportspeople from Baltimore
People from Beit Shemesh
Jewish martial artists
Jewish sportswomen
Female Muay Thai practitioners
1995 births
Kunlun Fight kickboxers
Competitors at the 2017 World Games